The 2015 RBC Tennis Championships of Dallas was a professional tennis tournament played on indoor hard courts. It was the 18th edition of the tournament which was part of the 2015 ATP Challenger Tour. It took place in Dallas, United States between 2 and 8 February 2015.

Singles main-draw entrants

Seeds

 1 Rankings are as of January 26, 2015.

Other entrants
The following players received wildcards into the singles main draw:
  Thai-Son Kwiatkowski
  Eric Quigley
  Connor Smith
  Ryan Sweeting

The following players got into the singles main draw as a special exempt:
  Nicolas Meister

The following players got into the singles main draw as an alternate:
  Jason Jung
  Agustín Velotti

The following players received entry from the qualifying draw:
  Dimitar Kutrovsky
  Cameron Norrie
  Andrey Rublev
  Maxime Tchoutakian

Champions

Singles

 Tim Smyczek def.  Rajeev Ram, 6–2, 4–1, ret.

Doubles

 Denys Molchanov /  Andrey Rublev def.  Hans Hach Verdugo /  Luis Patiño, 6–4, 7–6(7–5)

External links
Official Website

RBC Tennis Championships of Dallas
Challenger of Dallas
RBC Tennis Championships of Dallas
RBC Tennis Championships of Dallas
RBC Tennis Championships of Dallas